Tony DeSare (born 1976) is an American jazz singer, pianist and songwriter.

Early life
DeSare was born in Glens Falls, New York in 1976. He began playing the piano as a young child, and had public performances in his late teens. He kept performing locally during his studies at Ithaca College.

Later life and career
DeSare moved to New York in 1998 and played in a hotel, then performed in an off-Broadway musical. He met guitarist Bucky Pizzarelli, who helped his career develop.

DeSare's debut album, Want You, was released by Telarc in 2005. The material included standards, covers of lesser-known pieces, and originals. It peaked at No. 43 on the Billboard jazz albums chart.

DeSare's 2007 release Last First Kiss also included originals and standards, from Prince's "Kiss" and Carole King's "I Feel the Earth Move" to "Gee Baby Ain't I Good to You" and "How Deep Is the Ocean?" It was featured on NPR's Weekend Edition Saturday and reached No. 8 on the Billboard jazz albums chart.

Telarc released Radio Show, which included standards and DeSare's originals, around 2009. A Christmas album, Christmas Home, was released by AJD around 2016.

Discography
 Want You (Telarc, 2005)
 Last First Kiss (Telarc, 2007)
 Radio Show (Telarc, 2009)
 PiANO (AJD, 2013)
 Christmas Home (AJD, 2015)
 Lush Life (with Tedd Firth) (AJD, 2019)

References

1976 births
Living people
21st-century American pianists
21st-century American male musicians
American jazz singers
American jazz pianists
American male jazz musicians
American male pianists
Songwriters from New York (state)
Ithaca College alumni
People from Glens Falls, New York
Telarc Records artists
Jazz musicians from New York (state)
American male songwriters